The Harrisburg Line is a rail line owned and operated by the Norfolk Southern Railway (NS) in the U.S. state of Pennsylvania. The line runs from Philadelphia west to Harrisburg. 

The Harrisburg Line was formed the day Conrail began operations, April 1, 1976, from two former Reading Company lines, the original namesake main line to Reading, Pennsylvania, and the Lebanon Valley Branch.

Today, the Harrisburg Line is owned by Norfolk Southern Railway under their Harrisburg Division. The Harrisburg Line runs through two tunnels, the Flat Rock Tunnel in Lower Merion Township and the Black Rock Tunnel in Phoenixville.

History

The Harrisburg Line, as a single rail line, was formed on April 1, 1976. However, under the Reading Company, the Harrisburg Line was two rail lines: the original main line from Reading to Philadelphia and the Lebanon Valley Railroad from Reading to Harrisburg.

The Reading Company main line was established on July 16, 1838 between Reading and Norristown, Pennsylvania by the Reading Company’s Philadelphia and Reading Rail Road. The Reading to Norristown route is the Reading Company main line's original route/right of way. The Reading Company main line was extended to Philadelphia from Norristown on December 9, 1839. The Reading Company main line was later extended to the north from Reading to Port Clinton, Pennsylvania.

The Lebanon Valley Branch was opened by the Lebanon Valley Railroad from Reading to Harrisburg and the line and its railroad were purchased by the Reading Company on March 20, 1858. The Lebanon Valley Railroad built the Lebanon Valley Branch a few months before it got purchased by the Reading Company.

The Reading Company's railroad properties along with the Reading Company main line and the Lebanon Valley Branch became part of the Consolidated Rail Corporation (Conrail) on April 1, 1976 and the Reading Company main line’s Reading to Philadelphia trackage and all of the Lebanon Valley Branch were combined into a new rail line which became known as the Harrisburg Line. The Reading to Port Clinton trackage was separated from the Reading Company main line and was later sold to Reading Blue Mountain and Northern Railroad. The newly created Harrisburg Line continued under Conrail until the late 1990s.

The Harrisburg Line became part of Norfolk Southern Railway on June 1, 1999, after the breakup of Conrail. Other Conrail lines such as the Lehigh Line (former main line of the Lehigh Valley Railroad with Central Railroad of New Jersey used trackage), the Pittsburgh Line, Reading Line, Buffalo Line, the Lurgan Branch and the Royalton Branch also became lines of the Norfolk Southern Railway on the same date.

Connections
At its east end, near the East Falls neighborhood in Philadelphia, Pennsylvania, the Harrisburg Line junctions with CSX Transportation's Trenton Subdivision and Philadelphia Subdivision. Its west end in Harrisburg, Pennsylvania is at a junction with the Pittsburgh Line, the Lurgan Branch, the Royalton Branch, and Amtrak's Keystone Corridor (Philadelphia to Harrisburg Main Line).

The line junctions the Morrisville Line (indirectly) at Norristown, Pennsylvania and the Reading Line near Reading, Pennsylvania. Also at Norristown, the line junctions with SEPTA’s Manayunk/Norristown Line.

See also
 List of Norfolk Southern Railway lines

References

Norfolk Southern Railway lines
Norfolk Southern Railway
Conrail lines
Conrail
Rail infrastructure in Pennsylvania
Transportation in Harrisburg, Pennsylvania
Rail transportation in Philadelphia
Transportation in Reading, Pennsylvania